Csenger is a district in eastern part of Szabolcs-Szatmár-Bereg County. Csenger is also the name of the town where the district seat is found. The district is located in the Northern Great Plain Statistical Region. This district is a part of Szatmár historical and geographical region.

Geography
Csenger District borders with Fehérgyarmat District to the north, the Romanian county of Satu Mare to the east and south, and with Mátészalka District to the west. The number of the inhabited places in Csenger District is 11.

Municipalities
The district has 1 town, 2 large villages and 8 villages (ordered by population, as of 1 January 2013):

The bolded municipality is a city, municipalities in italics are large villages.

Demographics

In 2011, it had a population of 13,485 and the population density was 55/km².

Ethnicity
Besides the Hungarian majority, the main minorities are the Roma (approx. 2,500) and Romanians (200).

Total population (2011 census): 13,485
Ethnic groups (2011 census): Identified themselves: 14,221 persons:
Hungarians: 12,262 (86.22%)
Gypsies: 1,704 (11.98%)
Romanians: 178 (1.25%)
Others and indefinable: 77 (0.54%)
Approx. 1,000 persons in Csenger District did declare more than one ethnic group at the 2011 census.

Religion
Religious adherence in the county according to 2011 census:

Reformed – 8,244;
Catholic – 2,872 (Greek Catholic – 1,783; Roman Catholic – 1,089);
Orthodox – 55;
other religions – 181;
Non-religious – 434; 
Atheism – 11;
Undeclared – 1,688.

Gallery

See also
List of cities and towns of Hungary

References

External links
 Postal codes of the Csenger District

Districts in Szabolcs-Szatmár-Bereg County